Local council elections were held in Malta by 25 May 2019. For the first time, all 68 municipal council were renewed at the same time, following a reform partially initiated in the 2015 election, in which half were.

Results

Overall results
The election was not held in Mdina, since the number of candidates was equal to the number of seats. Therefore, the five candidates were directly elected. Turnout was under 40% in Gżira, Sliema, St. Julian's and St. Paul's Bay.

Results by council

References

External links 
Official results

Politics of Malta
Malta
2019 in Malta
May 2019 events in Malta
Local elections in Malta